Sextus Otto Lindberg (29 March 1835 – 20 February 1889) was a Swedish physician and botanist, known as a bryologist.

Life
He was born in Stockholm, and educated in Uppsala. He worked in the Grand Duchy of Finland, then part of the Russian Empire. He became professor of botany, and dean of the physics-mathematics faculty, at the University of Helsingfors.

He was honored with the genus name Lindbergia in the family Leskeaceae, published by Swedish bryologist Nils Conrad Kindberg in 1897. His son Harald was honored with the genus name Lindbergella in the family Poaceae, published by Irish botanist Norman Loftus Bor in 1969.

Lindberg died at Helsingfors. He was the father of the botanist Harald Lindberg (1871–1963).

Notes

External links
 www.nad.riksarkivet.se S Otto Lindberg.
 www.luomus.fi, Sextus Otto Lindberg.

1835 births
1889 deaths
Swedish botanists
19th-century Swedish physicians
Academic staff of the University of Helsinki
Members of the Royal Swedish Academy of Sciences
Bryologists